The 2019–20 PSA Men's World Squash Championship was the 2019–20 men's edition of the World Squash Championships, which serves as the individual world championship for squash players. The event took place in Doha, Qatar from 8 to 15 November 2019.

Seeds

  Mohamed El Shorbagy (quarterfinals)
  Tarek Momen (champion)
  Karim Abdel Gawad (third round)
  Paul Coll (finalist)
  Simon Rösner (semifinals)
  Diego Elías (quarterfinals)
  Mohamed Abouelghar (third round)
  Miguel Rodríguez (third round)

  Marwan El Shorbagy (semifinals)
  Saurav Ghosal (third round)
  Joel Makin (third round)
  Omar Mosaad (third round)
  Fares Dessouky (third round)
  Zahed Salem (quarterfinals)
  Grégoire Marche (first round)
  Daryl Selby (first round)

Draw and results

Finals

Top half

Section 1

Section 2

Bottom half

Section 3

Section 4

See also
 World Squash Championships
 2019–20 PSA Women's World Squash Championship

References

World Squash Championships
Men's World Squash Championship
Squash tournaments in Qatar
International sports competitions hosted by Qatar
Squash
PSA Men's World Squash Championship